The Eisner Award for Best Cover Artist is an award for creative achievement in American comic books, given to an artist of comics cover art.

Winners and nominees

Multiple awards and nominations

The following individuals have won Best Cover Artist one or more times:

The following individuals have received two or more nominations but never won Best Cover Artist:

See also
 Eisner Award for Best Publication for Early Readers
 Eisner Award for Best Academic/Scholarly Work
 Eisner Award for Best Writer
 Eisner Award for Best Coloring
 Eisner Award for Best Lettering

References

Cover Artist
1992 establishments in the United States
Annual events in the United States
Awards established in 1992